Iron County is a county located in the Lead Belt region in the U.S. state of Missouri. As of the 2020 census, the population was 9,537. The largest city and county seat is Ironton. Iron County was officially organized on February 17, 1857, and was named after the abundance of iron ore found within its borders.

Iron County includes the -long, -wide Arcadia Valley, the site of Pilot Knob, Ironton, and Arcadia, communities established by immigrants in the 19th Century. The valley is surrounded by the Saint Francois Mountains of the Ozarks Plateau. Iron County is also home to dozens of mountains, including the  Taum Sauk Mountain, the highest point in Missouri.

Geography

Adjacent counties
Washington County (north)
St. Francois County (northeast)
Madison County (east)
Wayne County (southeast)
Reynolds County (southwest)
Dent County (west)
Crawford County (northwest)

National protected areas
Mark Twain National Forest (part)
Pilot Knob National Wildlife Refuge

Demographics

As of the census of 2000, there were 10,697 people, 4,197 households, and 2,963 families residing in the county. The population density was 7/km2 (19/mi2). There were 4,907 housing units at an average density of 3/km2 (9/mi2). The racial makeup of the county was 96.74% White, 1.56% Black or African American, 0.34% Native American, 0.09% Asian, 0.22% from other races, and 1.05% from two or more races. Approximately 0.58% of the population were Hispanic or Latino of any race.

There were 4,197 households, out of which 32.00% had children under the age of 18 living with them, 56.80% were married couples living together, 9.40% had a female householder with no husband present, and 29.40% were non-families. 25.80% of all households were made up of individuals, and 11.40% had someone living alone who was 65 years of age or older. The average household size was 2.46 and the average family size was 2.94.

In the county, the population was spread out, with 25.00% under the age of 18, 7.80% from 18 to 24, 25.30% from 25 to 44, 24.80% from 45 to 64, and 17.10% who were 65 years of age or older. The median age was 40 years. For every 100 females there were 94.80 males. For every 100 females age 18 and over, there were 90.80 males.

The median income for a household in the county was $31,276, and the median income for a family was $38,037. Males had a median income of $28,603 versus $16,615 for females. The per capita income for the county was $16,717. About 13.80% of families and 19.00% of the population were below the poverty line, including 27.60% of those under age 18 and 13.20% of those age 65 or over.

Religion
According to the Association of Religion Data Archives County Membership Report (2000), Iron County is a part of the Bible Belt with evangelical Protestantism being the majority religion. The most predominant denominations among residents in Iron County who adhere to a religion are Southern Baptists (56.62%), Methodists (10.60%), and Roman Catholics (7.82%).

2020 census

Politics

Local
Control is evenly split at the local level in Iron County. Democrats hold 7 of the 14 positions in the county, while Republicans control the other 7.

State
In the Missouri House of Representatives, all of Iron County is a part of Missouri's 144th District and is currently represented by Republican Paul Fitzwater of Potosi. Fitzwater was elected in 2016 to his fourth and final term in the Missouri House.

In the Missouri Senate, all of Iron County is a part of Missouri's 3rd District and is currently represented by Republican Gary Romine of Farmington. Romine defeated former Democratic State Representative Joseph Fallert, Jr. of Ste. Genevieve in 2012 with 53.84 percent of the vote in the district, which includes most of the Missouri Lead Belt region. The seat was vacated by former Republican State Senator Kevin Engler of Farmington. Engler successfully served two terms/eight years in the Missouri Senate and was ineligible to seek a third term due to term limits.

Federal
Missouri's two U.S. Senators are Republicans Roy Blunt and Josh Hawley.

Hawley was elected to his first term in 2018 with 51.4 percent of the statewide vote over Democratic U.S. Senator Claire McCaskill; Iron County voters backed Hawley with 62.6 percent of the vote.

Blunt was re-elected in 2016 with 49.3 percent of the statewide vote over Democratic Missouri Secretary of State Jason Kander, Libertarian Jonathan Dine of Riverside, Constitutionalist Fred Ryman, and Green Party candidate Johnathan McFarland; Iron County voters supported Blunt with over 55 percent of the vote.

All of Iron County is included in Missouri's 8th Congressional District and is currently represented by Republican Jason T. Smith of Salem in the U.S. House of Representatives. Smith won a special election on Tuesday, June 4, 2013, to complete the remaining term of former Republican U.S. Representative Jo Ann Emerson of Cape Girardeau. Emerson announced her resignation a month after being reelected with over 70 percent of the vote in the district. She resigned to become CEO of the National Rural Electric Cooperative.

Political culture

Historically, Iron County has been one of the most reliably Democratic counties in Missouri. Located in the Lead Belt region of the state, mining has been important to the county's economy. It was one of only three predominantly rural counties in Missouri to vote for Barack Obama in 2008 (nearby Washington and Ste. Genevieve counties being the other two). Like much of the rest of the state's rural areas, the county saw a rapid rightward swing starting in 2000, when George W. Bush became the first Republican since 1984 (and the second since 1972) to carry it, after Bill Clinton had carried it in 1996 by over twenty points. Apart from the interruption in 2008, the Republican vote share has, as of 2020, grown in every subsequent election. At the local and state levels, however, Iron County still remains quite Democratic. At the same time Romney won Iron County by 15 points in 2012, all Democratic statewide candidates Jay Nixon (Governor), Claire McCaskill (U.S. Senator), Jason Kander (Secretary of State), Chris Koster (Attorney General), and Clint Zweifel (State Treasurer) carried Iron County by healthy margins; Peter Kinder (Lieutenant Governor) was the only other statewide Republican to win Iron County alongside Romney, and even then, the margin of victory was smaller than in most other rural counties.

Like most rural areas throughout Southeast Missouri, voters in Iron County generally adhere to socially and culturally conservative principles but are more moderate or populist on economic issues. In 2004, Missourians voted on a constitutional amendment to define marriage as the union between a man and a woman—it overwhelmingly passed Iron County with 80.90 percent of the vote. The initiative passed the state with 71 percent of support from voters as Missouri became the first state to ban same-sex marriage. In 2006, Missourians voted on a constitutional amendment to fund and legalize embryonic stem cell research in the state—it failed in Iron County with 56.03 percent voting against the measure. The initiative narrowly passed the state with 51 percent of support from voters as Missouri became one of the first states in the nation to approve embryonic stem cell research. Despite Iron County's longstanding tradition of supporting socially conservative platforms, voters in the county have a penchant for advancing populist causes like increasing the minimum wage. In 2006, Missourians voted on a proposition (Proposition B) to increase the minimum wage in the state to $6.50 an hour—it passed Iron County with 78.25 percent of the vote. The proposition strongly passed every single county in Missouri with 75.94 percent voting in favor as the minimum wage was increased to $6.50 an hour in the state. During the same election, voters in five other states also strongly approved increases in the minimum wage.

Donald Trump won the county with 74% of the vote in 2016, continuing a trend of white, rural Midwestern counties that had voted for Obama in 2008 and/or 2012 and had swung hard to Trump in 2016. The Trump campaign had made promises to bolster the jobs situations in the Rust Belt, which combined with elevated social liberalism from the Democrats, may have played a role in the margins -- which could be said for various other white working-class Midwestern counties that did the same.

Missouri presidential preference primary (2008)

In the 2008 Missouri Presidential Preference Primary, voters in Iron County from both political parties supported candidates who finished in second place in the state at large and nationally. Former U.S. Senator Hillary Clinton (D-New York) received more votes, a total of 1,180, than any candidate from either party in Iron County during the 2008 Missouri Presidential Primaries. She also received more votes altogether than the total number of votes cast in the entire Republican Primary in Iron County.

Education
Of adults 25 years of age and older in Iron County, 65.2% possesses a high school diploma or higher while 8.4% holds a bachelor's degree or higher as their highest educational attainment.

Public schools
Arcadia Valley School District - Ironton
Arcadia Valley Elementary School (PK-04)
Arcadia Valley Middle School (05-08)
Arcadia Valley High School (09-12)
Belleview R-III Elementary School - Belleview - (K-08)
Iron County C-4 School District - Viburnum
Viburnum Elementary School (K-06)
Viburnum High School (07-12)
South Iron County R-I School District - Annapolis
South Iron County Elementary School (PK-06)
South Iron County High School (07-12)

Vocational/technical schools
Arcadia Valley Career Technical Center - Ironton - (09-12)

Public libraries
 Ozark Regional Library

Transportation

State highways
 Route 21
 Route 32
 Route 49
 Route 72

Railroads
The Iron Mountain Railroad, later incorporated into Union Pacific, runs through Arcadia Valley. The train station in Arcadia serves Amtrak's Texas Eagle.

Communities

Cities and Towns

Annapolis
Arcadia
Belleview
Des Arc
Ironton (county seat)
Pilot Knob
Viburnum

Unincorporated Communities

 Banner
 Belleview
 Bixby
 Chloride
 Ghermanville
 Glover
 Good Water
 Goodland
 Graniteville
 Hogan
 Middlebrook
 Minimum
 Pin Hook
 Redmondville
 Sabula
 Vulcan

See also
National Register of Historic Places listings in Iron County, Missouri

References

External links
Iron County from the Western Historical Manuscript Collection of Missouri University of Science and Technology
Plat book of Iron County from the Missouri Digital Heritage website of the Missouri Secretary of State
Iron County Sheriff's Office

 
1857 establishments in Missouri
Populated places established in 1857